Ceferino Namuncurá (August 26, 1886 – May 11, 1905) was a religious student, the object of a Roman Catholic cultus of veneration in northern Patagonia and throughout Argentina.

Early life 
He was born at Chimpay, a small town in Valle Medio, Río Negro Province, Argentina, the sixth child of Rosario Burgos and a Mapuche cacique, Manuel Namuncurá. At the age of eight, he was baptized by a Salesian missionary priest, Domingo Milanesio. Namuncurá's early years were spent by the Río Negro river, and it was here that he, according to legend, miraculously survived a fall into the river.

His father Manuel, Chief of the Mapuches, promoted to honorary colonel in the Argentine army, decided that his son would study in Buenos Aires to prepare himself "to be useful to his people." Thanks to the friendship of Manuel with General Luís María Campos, Minister of War and the Navy of Argentina, the boy came to study in the National Workshops of the Navy as a carpenter's apprentice. There he would remain for three months. Being the only native Indian in the school, Ceferino was mistreated by the other students, and he soon fell ill. He wrote to his father that he was not happy in that place, and Manuel then asked former Argentine president Luis Sáenz Peña's advice. He recommended to Colonel Manuel Namuncurá that he send the boy to the Salesians of Don Bosco.

Education
On September 20, 1897, Ceferino went to study with the Salesians at the Colegio Pío IX, a technical academy in Almagro, Buenos Aires.
 There, he showed himself to be an excellent student and choral musician. He enjoyed his studies and sports and performed card tricks for his classmates, and taught them archery. From April 2, 1901, Carlos Gardel, afterward a legendary tango singer and film actor, became a student at the academy and sang along with Ceferino in the chorus.

Manuel, his father, wanted him back home to serve as interpreter and secretary when he finished his studies. However, Ceferino was already enthusiastic about becoming a Salesian priest.

In Italy 
Although his health was already generally frail, Ceferino began studying for the priesthood. In 1904, he departed for Italy accompanying Mgr. Giovanni Cagliero, a former disciple of Don Bosco who was to become an Archbishop. Pope Pius X received them in September, after which Namuncurá moved to Turin and later to the Salesian College "Villa Sora" in Frascati, to continue his education. He became increasingly ill during the Italian winter. He was taken to Rome, where he finally succumbed to pulmonary tuberculosis on May 11, 1905, at the Fate bene fratelli hospital.

Back to Argentina 
In 1924 his remains were returned to Argentina and placed in the chapel at Fortín Mercedes, in the southern part of Buenos Aires Province. In 1945, a request for his beatification was forwarded to the Holy See. Between May 13 and July 10, 1947, the church officially started the process for Canonization of Ceferino Namuncurá, with 21 then-living witnesses deposing evidence in favor of his virtues.

At his birthplace of Chimpay, a small chapel was erected, where believers from Río Negro Province and beyond began to pray for his intercession.

On June 22, 1972, Pope Paul VI promulgated the Decree of Heroism of His Virtues, and Ceferino was thus proclaimed venerable, becoming the first Catholic Argentine to receive that title and the first South American aborigine.

The devotion to Ceferino Namuncurá, the saintly young Mapuche, known popularly as The Lily of Patagonia ("El lirio de la Patagonia") became very extensive in Buenos Aires and throughout Argentina. In particular, the indigenous people recognize him as one of their own. The affection of the people of Argentina for this selfless young man is quite touchingly sincere, and images and representations of his face are myriad. In 1991 his relics were translated from the small sanctuary chapel to the roomier Sanctuary of Mary, Help of Christians, at the same town of Fortín Mercedes.

Beatification 
In 2000 a committee of Vatican pathologists declared that the healing of the uterine cancer of a young mother, Valeria Herrera from Córdoba, Argentina, could not be explained medically, with which it was left to church authorities to decree that it was a miracle due to the intercession of Ceferino Namuncurá. This opened the way for the beatification of Ceferino.

Pope Benedict XVI finally decreed his beatification on July 6, 2007.  The beatification ceremony was held in Chimpay, Argentina, on November 11, 2007. It was one of the few beatification ceremonies held outside the Vatican and in the blessed's land; it was the first beatification of a South American aborigine. Ceferino was beatified by Cardinal Tarcisio Bertone, a Salesian of Don Bosco and Vatican Secretary of State. The ceremony was attended by more than ten thousand people with the active participation of Mapuche delegations.

Ceferino's liturgical calendar memorial as a Catholic beatus was established on August 26.

Legacy of Ceferino 
Ceferino Namuncurá's first legacy is to his nation and people: Argentina and the Mapuche people. There are many books and videos on the life of the young holy man, most of them in Spanish. The meaning of Ceferino is also important to the Mapuche and all South American ancestral peoples. Manuel Gálvez, the prominent Argentine novelist and biographer, wrote a biography of Ceferino Namuncurá in 1947: El Santito de la Toldería. La vida perfecta de Ceferino Namuncurá.

Ceferino Namuncura Park, along the Negro River, in Chimpay, is named in his honor.

Zephyrin: The Musicale
Zephyrin: The Musicale is a musical play in honor of Ceferino Namuncurá. It was shown on March 14, 15, and 16, 2008, at SM Cinema One in Cebu, Philippines. It was written by Jude Thaddeus Gitamondoc and directed by Daisy Brilliantes Ba-ad with the help of Don Bosco Technology Center Productions. The musical was a Salesian Production made in honor of the beatification of Ceferino. The musical featured amateur actors, mostly coming from high school and elementary school. The story begins when Ceferino is only a child and ends after his death.

See also
Religion in Argentina

References

External links 

 Site about Ceferino Namuncurá (Spanish)

 Zeferino Namuncurá (1886-1905)
 Image of Ceferino Namuncura by Perez Celis  Ceferino Namuncurá - Pérez Celis
 Ceferino Namuncurá - Pérez Celis

1886 births
1905 deaths
19th-century Mapuche people
20th-century Mapuche people
20th-century venerated Christians
Argentine beatified people
Roman Catholic child blesseds
20th-century deaths from tuberculosis
Tuberculosis deaths in Italy
Argentine people of Mapuche descent
People from Río Negro Province
Salesian Order
Indigenous religious leaders of the Americas
Beatifications by Pope Benedict XVI
Infectious disease deaths in Lazio